The Animal's Wife is a 2016 Colombian drama film directed by Víctor Gaviria. It was screened in the Contemporary World Cinema section at the 2016 Toronto International Film Festival.

Cast
 Natalia Polo as Amparo Gómez
 Tito Alexánder Gómez as Libardo Ramírez

References

External links
 

2016 films
2016 drama films
2010s Spanish-language films
Films directed by Víctor Gaviria
Colombian drama films
2010s Colombian films